Leslie Scott Falconer Mitchell (4 October 1905 – 23 November 1985) was a British announcer who was heard on newsreel soundtracks, radio and television. He was the first voice heard on BBC Television at its inception on 2 November 1936, and also made the first announcement on Associated-Rediffusion, the first ITV company, on 22 September 1955. His voice was perhaps most recognised, however, from his long association with British Movietone News, for whose newsreels he commentated during the Second World War and for many years afterwards.

Early life
Born in Edinburgh, Scotland, Mitchell's parents separated while he was a child. He was brought up by the novelist W. J. Locke and his wife, after his own mother went to America during the early years of the First World War and was unable to return.  Mitchell was educated at the King's School, Canterbury. Later, he was prevented from joining the Royal Navy by ill health, which also prevented him from serving in the Second World War. He began as a stage and film actor, but suffered from multiple injuries in a road accident, which kept him out of work for over a year, as the play he was appearing in was about to transfer to the West End.

Career
After a brief period working as a trainee stockbroker, Mitchell secured small roles in stage productions.  He had no dramatic training, but secured roles with the aid of his assets - notably good looks and a rich voice.  He toured Britain with the Art League for two years, from 1923, and subsequently appeared in London West End productions.  However, just as Edgar Wallace's Flying Squad, in which he had appeared on tour, was about to move to the West End, Mitchell suffered multiple injuries in a motorcycle accident.  He was unable to work for one year.  Later, he returned to theatre work, having had plastic surgery to his face - as well having his jaw rebuilt.

Television career
He began appearing on BBC Radio in 1932 and joined the Corporation's staff in 1934, working as a general announcer and a producer of variety programmes.  In 1936 he became one of the three announcers, chosen from 600 applicants, for the BBC's fledgling Television Service, along with Jasmine Bligh and Elizabeth Cowell, which was then available only in London.  He also conducted interviews for the magazine programme Picture Page.

During World War II he provided the commentary for the Movietone News and appeared as himself in the comedy film The Black Sheep of Whitehall in which comedian Will Hay drives him to a nervous breakdown.

In 1946, suspecting that commercial broadcasting would eventually be allowed in the United Kingdom, he travelled to the United States and gained experience of the methods of publicity used there.  In the post-war years he had a stint as Sir Alexander Korda's director of publicity, but was mainly a freelance writer, commentator and producer.

In 1955 he joined Associated-Rediffusion, where he became senior announcer, and was also in charge of talks and as chairman of discussion programmes.  He became freelance again in 1958.  Much of his later work was on programmes concerning the early days of British television, such as a celebration of 25 years of BBC TV which he jointly narrated with Richard Dimbleby in 1961, and a 40th anniversary documentary in 1976.  He also presented the nostalgic Tyne Tees Television series Those Wonderful TV Times (1976–1978).

Mitchell's biography Leslie Mitchell Reporting... was published in 1981. He was married twice. He died in London, at the age of 80 after years of ill health.

External links
Leslie Mitchell voices "The Ordeal of the Seafarer"

References

1905 births
1985 deaths
British radio personalities
Radio and television announcers
British television presenters
People educated at The King's School, Canterbury
Entertainers from Edinburgh